The 2000 Montreal Alouettes finished in first place in the East Division with a 12–6 record. This was Anthony Calvillo's first season as the full-time starter, and he didn't disappoint, having an allstar year, first leading his team to the Grey Cup, by beating the Winnipeg Blue Bombers 35–24  in the East Final, as they appeared in the Grey Cup for the first time since 1979, but lost to the BC Lions, who were led by Damon Allen. Overall it was a great year for the Alouettes, even if they lost the Grey Cup.

Offseason

CFL draft

Preseason

 * The Alouettes won this game in a pre-planned demonstration of the CFL's new overtime format 19–16.

Regular season

Season Standings

Season Schedule

Roster

Playoffs

East Final

Grey Cup

Awards

2000 CFL All-Star Selections
Bryan Chiu – Centre
Barron Miles – Defensive Back
Mike Pringle – Running Back
Davis Sanchez – Cornerback
Pierre Vercheval – Offensive Guard

2000 CFL Eastern All-Star Selections
Anthony Calvillo – Quarterback
Ben Cahoon – Slotback
Mike pringle – Running Back
Pierre vercheval – Offensive Guard
Bryan chiu – Centre
Swift Birch – Defensive End
Irvin Smith – Cornerback
Davis sanchez – Cornerback
Barron miles – Defensive Back
Lester Smith – Defensive Safety

2000 Intergold CFLPA All-Star Selections

References

Montreal Alouettes
Montreal Alouettes seasons
James S. Dixon Trophy championship seasons